Transmembrane immunoglobulin and munin domain (TIM) proteins are a family of cell surface immunomodulatory proteins.

See also 
 TIM1

References 

Integral membrane proteins